Joseph Ruby (born August 8, 1987) is an American professional wrestler. He is currently signed to WWE, where he performs on the NXT brand under the ring name Joe Gacy. He is the leader of The Schism.

Gacy is best known for his work in Combat Zone Wrestling (CZW), where he was a three-time CZW World Heavyweight Champion and a three-time CZW Wired Champion. He also appeared for Evolve, where he was a one-time Evolve Tag Team Champion.

Professional wrestling career

Combat Zone Wrestling (2006–2020)
On August 5, 2017, at Once in a Lifetime, Gacy appeared at the event, while ring announcer Larry Legend was about to introduce the match between Lio Rush and Joey Janela. Gacy headbutted Legend, before criticising the direction CZW were going in, and then putting Legend through a barbed wire board. In response to this, D. J. Hyde (kayfabe) fired Gacy on his birthday over Twitter. On September 9, at Down with the Sickness, Gacy and his masked goons appeared after Strickland's title match with Jason Cade, but was chased off by the rest of the locker room. On October 14, at The Wolf of Wrestling, a masked man was seen in the crowd, and offered Kit Osbourne the chance to join him. Osbourne refused and was abducted by a group of masked men. They resurfaced later in the night, after Strickland's title match with Ethan Page. One of the masked men, purportedly Gacy, threatened to have Osbourne curbstomped onto a chair, unless Matt Tremont reinstated him and gave him a title shot at the next event. Strickland urged Tremont to do so, and Tremont accepted Gacy's proposal, but Osbourne was curbstomped anyway. This turned out to be a ruse, as Gacy ran out from the back to attack Tremont; the man initially thought to be Gacy was actually Dan Barry, and the man who curbstomped Osbourne was Matthew Palmer. With Barry and Palmer aligning themselves with Gacy, it led to the formation of F.E.A.R.

On November 11, at Night of Infamy, Gacy faced Strickland for the title. Towards the end, Strickland put Gacy's head in a chair, and was about to jump from the top rope, but was attacked by Barry and Gacy's masked goons. Some of the goons brought a guardrail out from under the ring which was propped up in the opposite corner, and as Gacy was about to powerbomb Strickland through the guardrail, Sami Callihan, Dezmond Xavier and John Silver came out to make the save. This resulted in Alex Reynolds being unmasked by Silver, who joined F.E.A.R., effectively breaking up the Beaver Boys. Reynolds and Barry held Strickland in place, as Gacy hit a big frogsplash on him to win the match. His second reign was short-lived as Rickey Shane Page cashed in his ultimate opportunity coin, and Larry Legend (disguised as a masked goon) struck Gacy in the back with a nightstick, allowing Page to hit a chokebreaker on him to win the match. Following a staredown with Strickland, Page offered a rematch to the former champions at Cage of Death 19. On December 9, Gacy faced Page and Strickland in the aforementioned stipulation match, in an attempt to win back the title. During the match, Gacy was chokeslammed through a pane of burning glass, which led to his masked goons to come out from the back to distract Page and Strickland. He got up and climbed the scaffolding to attack Page, but was thrown off the top by a masked man (revealed to be the debuting Anthony Gangone), onto a table with a pane of glass propped up on it, ending his involvement in the match.

On February 10, 2018 at Nineteen, Gacy, flanked by Reynolds and Barry, faced Gangone in his debut match for CZW. Towards the end, Gangone hit a bicycle kick, followed by an inverted Go 2 Sleep on Gacy to win the match. Afterwards, a masked man jumped Gangone, and revealed himself to be Eddy Blackwater. At the same event, Gacy was involved in the CZW World Heavyweight Title #1 contendership 30-man rumble match, eventually won by Maxwell Jacob Friedman, but was eliminated by Gangone, continuing the feud. On February 23, at Greetings from Asbury Park, Gacy, Barry and Blackwater interfered in the singles match in a singles match between John Silver and Reynolds, allowing Reynolds to hit his finisher on Silver and pick up the win. Immediately after that, F.E.A.R. faced off against The House of Gangone, which ended in defeat when Gangone pinned Blackwater. 

On March 10, at Proving Grounds, Gacy faced Jonathan Gresham. Gresham had Gacy in a figure four leg lock, but F.E.A.R. came out to make the save. The stable started beating down on Gresham, and Silver ran in to break up the attack. In the resulting chaos, Barry accidentally hit Gacy in the head with a chair, allowing Gresham to perform a deadlift German suplex and pin Gacy for the win. Following the match, Barry offered his spot in the Best of the Best to Gacy, as a way to stay in his good graces. Gacy accepted the offer, but then kicked him out of the stable by superkicking, and then powerbombing him through a stack of chairs. On April 14, at Best of the Best, Gacy defeated Brandon Kirk, Joey Janela and Rich Swann in a four-way quarter-final match, defeating Swann with a Ace Crusher, followed by a superkick. In the semi-final, he faced Zachary Wentz. Towards the end, Blackwater interfered by striking Wentz in the back with a kendo stick, but he kicked out at two. However, Gangone's music hit, which distracted Blackwater and allowed Wentz to get the pin on Gacy. On June 26, at Dark City, Gacy faced Maxwell Jacob Friedman for the World Heavyweight Championship. Friedman initially had Dezmond Xavier as his opponent for his first title defence, but got his legal team to change the match so Gacy was inserted instead. Earlier on in the match, Gacy was beaten down by Freidman's henchmen, "Smart" Mark Sterling and CPA, while he distracted the referee; when Blackwater came out to make the save, Friedman pointed in his direction and the referee sent Blackwater to the back. After that, Gacy struggled and was unable to cover Friedman due to his hurt left arm preventing him from making the cover. When he finally performed a superkick and a sit-down powerbomb on Friedman, the referee was down, and could not count the pin. Gacy had to break the pin up in order to get the referee's attention, and Gangone used this to his advantage, attacking Gacy with a running knee with the title belt in front of it, before shoving Friedman's limp body onto Gacy's and putting the referee in place to count the pin. Gangone further attacked Gacy after the match and retreated once Blackwater came out to make the save; an irate Gacy told D. J. Hyde to book the match for the next event.

On July 28, at New Heights, Gacy, working as a face, hit an Alabama slam onto a pile of thumbtacks on Gangone, followed by a buckle bomb into a Falcon arrow back onto the thumbtacks for the win, ending the feud. On September 8, at Down with the Sickness, Gacy faced Rickey Shane Page in a World Heavyweight Championship #1 contendership tournament match, dubbed an "opportunity for an opportunity match". In what was a very technical matchup, Page eventually put Gacy away with two successive chokebreakers. On October 13, at Better Than Our Best, Gacy faced Desean Pratt, but the match finished in a no-contest, when Reynolds, accompanied by his own masked goons, attacked Pratt and turned on Gacy. On November 10, at Night of Infamy, Gacy teamed with Pratt to face Reynolds and Tim Donst. Towards the end, Pratt uppercutted Reynolds, allowing Gacy to hit him with a Liger Bomb. However, Gacy had to break up the pin as the referee was down. Donst then hit Gacy with a chair and almost won the match when he had Pratt submitted, until Pratt physically crawled over for a rope break. Gacy got back into the ring and hit Donst with a Ace Crusher for the win. Afterwards, Gacy and Pratt were jumped by Reynolds and his masked goons. Gacy returned with his masked goons, resulting in a brawl and was about to hit Reynolds with a chair, but Reynolds ducked and hit Blackwater instead, who had come out to assist Gacy. This allowed Reynolds to hit his finisher on Gacy, who then took the chair and sat on it, with Gacy underneath, taunting his former stablemate. On December 9, at Cage of Death XX, Gacy faced Reynolds in a singles match. They began the match by going back and forth with their offence; Gacy with quick strikes and Reynolds intentionally slowing everything down. Reynolds went to clothesline Gacy, but he ducked and the referee was hit, allowing Gacy to hit a Liger Bomb only to realise that the referee could not count the pin. Reynolds' masked goons came out to interfere, which Gacy dealt with quickly, but when he got back into the ring, he was hit with a low blow followed by a cutter. Gacy kicked out at two, and Reynolds in his frustration, attacked the referee. Gacy's masked goons came out to the ring, but they were taken out by Blackwater with his kendo stick. However, this turned out to be a swerve, as Blackwater struck Reynolds in the back just as he was about to put Gacy away. Gacy hit a Liger Bomb on Reynolds to win the match, ending the feud. After the match, Gacy left his trademark mask in the ring, signifying the disbandment of F.E.A.R.

On February 9, 2019, at Twenty, Gacy was involved in two matches on the card, both of which ended in defeat. Firstly, he lost a tag team match alongside former F.E.A.R. stablemate Blackwater, against The REP (Dave McCall and Nate Carter). After that, he lost a singles match against Leyla Hirsch, which was also her second match of the night. On August 10, at CZW vs. wXw, Gacy returned to the promotion by clotheslining then-champion John Silver, following his match against Anthony Greene. Gacy told the crowd that he was coming for the World Heavyweight Championship, despite the fact that he did not want it. On September 13, at Down with the Sickness, Gacy defeated Silver, in a three-way match also involving Conor Claxton, beginning his third reign. On November 30, in a backstage segment at Night of Infamy, D. J. Hyde offered to face Gacy at Cage of Death XXI, with his career on the line. Hyde's rival Maven Bentley disagreed, and told Hyde to find someone who would wrestle on his behalf to face Gacy instead. On December 14, Gacy faced Hyde's representative in Matt Tremont. Anthony Gangone and his valet Valentina interfered towards the end, with Valentina lowblowing Tremont, before Gangone speared him through a door, allowing Gacy to pin him to win the match. In the resulting aftermath, Gacy was embraced by Bentley, and was then challenged for a future title shot by Alex Shelley.

Evolve (2018–2020)
Gacy made his first appearance for Evolve in a tag team match on September 8, 2018, at Evolve 112. He tagged alongside Steve Pena, in a defeat to Facade and Jason Kincaid. His first match as a singles competitor was in a defeat to Adrian Jaoude, on October 28, at Evolve 114. His first win came against Colby Corino on January 18, 2019, at Evolve 116.

On February 16, at Evolve 122, following the title match between JD Drake and Montez Ford, Eddie Kingston jumped both wrestlers, and was joined in the post-match attack by Gacy, Corino and Shane Strickland, and in the process, forming The Unwanted. On 15 March, at Evolve 123, Gacy and Kingston defeated the Street Profits for the Evolve Tag Team Championship, ending the NXT tag team's reign at 138 days. During WrestleMania weekend, on April 4, at Evolve 125, Gacy and Kingston defeated the DDT pairing of Konosuke Takeshita and Mao. On May 10, at Evolve 127, Gacy was defeated by Drake in a title match for the WWN Championship. The following day, at Evolve 128, Gacy and Kingston defeated Drake and Anthony Henry, in which Drake took the pin after Henry walked out on him. On June 29, at Evolve 129, Gacy and Kingston defeated the pairing of Anthony Greene and Curt Stallion, in which Gacy hit Stallion with a right hand, allowing Kingston to suplex him for the victory.

On June 20, at Evolve 130, Gacy and Kingston interfered in the title match between Drake and Babatunde, resulting in a no-contest. They continued the beatdown, until Drake and Babatunde were able to separate them and give them a round of chops. Gacy and Kingston then ran to the back, while Babatunde chased after them. Later that night, Gacy and Kingston were involved in non-title four-way elimination tag team match, alongside A. R. Fox and Leon Ruff, The Beaver Boys (Alex Reynolds and John Silver) and Milk Chocolate (Brandon Watts and Randy Summers). The final two teams came down to The Unwanted and Fox and Ruff, and ended when Fox landed a coast-to-coast to Gacy, which led to Ruff hitting a Ruff Ride, followed by a 450 splash by Fox on Kingston for the victory. Afterwards, Gacy and Kingston attacked Fox and Ruff from behind, and Babutunde came out from the back and was about to perform a double chokeslam on The Unwanted, until Corino and Sean Maluta came out to make the save, resulting in a beatdown. On July 13, at Evolve 131, Fox and Ruff defeated Gacy and Kingston for the Evolve Tag Team Championship, ending The Unwanted's reign at 120 days.

Westside Xtreme Wrestling (2020)
On March 8, 2020, at the wXwNOW Showcase during wXw 16 Carat Gold, Gacy defeated Anthony Greene in a non-title match, with a discus lariat.

WWE (2020–present)

Initial feuds & "Safe Space" character (2020-2022)
On August 31, 2020, it was reported that Gacy had signed a contract with WWE, following the company's purchase of Evolve in July. On October 7, WWE announced that he had reported for training at the Performance Center, alongside five other professional wrestlers from Evolve. On the July 2, 2021, episode of 205 Live, Gacy made his television debut, defeating Desmond Troy to qualify for the 2021 NXT Breakout Tournament. On the August 3 episode of NXT, Gacy was eliminated in the first round by Trey Baxter. On the September 21 episode of NXT, Gacy began a new gimmick, portraying a politically correct spokesperson who "wants to make NXT his safe space", therefore establishing himself as a heel. He was later defeated by Cameron Grimes. On the October 5 episode of NXT, he defeated Ikemen Jiro and proceeded to give him a hug afterwards. The following week, he fought Tommaso Ciampa in a match where had he won, he would've been added to the NXT Championship match between Ciampa and Bron Breakker at NXT: Halloween Havoc but he was unsuccessful. Around this time, Gacy formed an alliance with Harland who began accompanying him to the ring as his bodyguard. On the November 23 episode of NXT 2.0, he convinced the Cruiserweight Champion Roderick Strong to grant him a match for the Cruiserweight Championship at NXT WarGames, despite not weighing 205 pounds or below. The following week, he welcomed everybody to his All-Inclusive Invitational, an open challenge for people of all shapes, sizes and genders, but was interrupted by Roderick Strong and Diamond Mine who attacked him. At War Games, Gacy was unsuccessful at capturing the title.

In April 2022, Gacy began feuding with the NXT Champion Bron Breakker after he and Harland kidnapped Breakker's father, Rick Steiner. Gacy's character began to morph into a dark and sadistic cult-like leader, who demanded Steiner's Hall of Fame ring in exchange for his safe return. On April 29th, 2022, Harland was released from his WWE contract, thus ending his and Gacy's partnership. A title match between Gacy and Breakker was later made official for NXT Spring Breakin' on May 3, 2022. Gacy would fail to capture the championship. After the match, Bron Breakker would be attacked and carried out of the arena by druids. These druids would accompany Gacy and would sometimes attack Breakker. Gacy eventually challenged Breakker for a rematch at NXT In Your House, with the stipulation that if Breakker gets disqualified, he loses the NXT Championship. Gacy would fail to capture the championship yet again.

The Schism (2022-present)
On the July 19 episode of NXT 2.0, Gacy revealed the druids' identities as the Dyad, consisting of Jagger Reed and Rip Fowler, formerly known as the Grizzled Young Veterans. Collectively, Gacy and the Dyad are known as the Schism, and they began a feud with Cameron Grimes. During this rivalry, the debuting Ava Raine, the daughter of Dwayne Johnson who is known as The Rock, would join Schism and cost Grimes in his final match with Gacy on the November 8th episode of NXT, ending the feud. Gacy competed in the Men's Iron Survivor match at NXT Deadline, but was unsuccessful in becoming number one contender.

Championships and accomplishments
 BriiCombination Wrestling
 BCW Heavyweight Championship (1 time)
 Combat Zone Wrestling
 CZW World Heavyweight Championship (3 times)
 CZW Wired Championship (3 times)
 Dynamite Championship Wrestling
 DCW No Limits Championship (1 time)
East Coast Wrestling Association
 ECWA Mid-Atlantic Heavyweight Championship (1 time)
 Evolve
 Evolve Tag Team Championship (1 time) – with Eddie Kingston
 Ground Breaking Wrestling
 GBW World Championship (1 time)
 GBW Breaker Championship (1 time)
 Maryland Championship Wrestling
 MCW Rage Television Championship (2 times)
 New York Wrestling Connection
 NYWC Fusion Championship (1 time)
 NWA Force One Pro Wrestling
 F1 Heavyweight Championship (1 time)
 F1 Tag Team Championship (1 time) – with Ryan Slater
 Pro Wrestling Illustrated
 Ranked No. 199 of the top 500 singles wrestlers in the PWI 500 in 2020
 Real Championship Wrestling
 RCW Tag Team Championship (1 time) – with Ryan Slater
 Vicious Outcast Wrestling
 VOW Anarchy Championship (1 time)
We Want Wrestling
We Want Wrestling Championship (1 time)
 Xcite Wrestling
 Xcite Heavyweight Championship (2 times)

References

External links
 
 
 
 

1987 births
Living people
American male professional wrestlers
Professional wrestlers from New Jersey
People from Franklin Township, Gloucester County, New Jersey
21st-century professional wrestlers
CZW World Heavyweight Champions
CZW Wired Champions